Henri Lebasque (25 September 1865 – 7 August 1937) was a French post-impressionist painter. He was born at Champigné (Maine-et-Loire). His work is represented in French museums, notably Angers, Geneva (Petit Palais), Lille (Musée des Beaux-Arts), Nantes, and Paris (Musée d’Orsay).

Education and artistic development
He started his education at the École régionale des beaux-arts d'Angers, and moved to Paris in 1886. There, Lebasque started studying under Léon Bonnat, and assisted Ferdinand Humbert with the decorative murals at the Panthéon. Around this time, Lebasque met Camille Pissarro and Auguste Renoir, who later would have a large impact on his work.

Lebasque's vision was coloured by his contact with younger painters, especially Édouard Vuillard and Pierre Bonnard, founders of Les Nabis, a group of Intimist painters that first favoured the calm and quietude of domestic subject matter. From his first acquaintance with Georges Seurat and Paul Signac, Lebasque learnt the significance of a colour theory which stressed the use of complementary colours in shading.

Career
Lebasque was a founding member of the Salon d'Automne in 1903 with his friend Henri Matisse and exhibited at the Salon des Indépendants. Two years later, a group of artists exhibited there including Georges Rouault, André Derain, Henri Ottmann, Édouard Vuillard, and Matisse. Lebasque also became friends with artists such as Raoul Dufy, Louis Valtat, and Henri Manguin, the last of whom introduced Lebasque to the South of France.

His time in South of France would lead to a radical transformation in Lebasque’s paintings, changing his colour palette forever. Other travels included the Vendée, Normandy, and Brittany.

Lebasque had some commercial success during his lifetime. He worked on the decorations at the theatre of the Champs-Elysées and of the Transatlantique sealiner.

Lebasque died at Cannet, Alpes Maritimes in 1937.

Gallery of paintings

References

External links

Henri Lebasque Bio - Findlay Galleries
 Benezit Dictionary of Artists, 2006, site Oxford Index (subscription or library membership required)
Galerie du Post-Impressionnisme – Works by Henri Lebasque
Musée d'Orsay – Collections catalogue
 Works Henri Lebasque in the museums of France; Joconde, culture.gouv.fr
 Sur Le Balcon - Henri Lebasque at the gallery Georges Petit (Hôtel Drouot) archive.org

19th-century French painters
French male painters
20th-century French painters
20th-century French male artists
1865 births
1937 deaths
Post-impressionist painters
Landscape artists
French still life painters
Modern painters
Modern printmakers
Woodcut designers
French illustrators
Fauvism
20th-century French printmakers
19th-century French male artists